Saint Jude were an English, London-based rock and soul band, fronted by the vocalist Lynne Jackaman.

They released their debut album, Diary Of A Soul Fiend, in September, 2010, which was produced by Chris Kimsey and recorded in Lexington, Kentucky featuring Jackaman, Adam Green, Lee Cook, Elliott Mortimer and Colin Palmer Kellogg as core members. In January, 2010 they were joined on stage by Rolling Stones guitarist Ronnie Wood at London's 100 Club.

On 11 December 2011, they were named Classic Rock magazine 's "Gig of the Week." They played the Germany Rockpalast venue (which was later broadcast on WDR), Rhythm Festival, Off The Tracks Festival, Cornbury Festival, High Voltage Festival, the UK leg of Sonisphere Festival, and completed a mini tour of the UK in December, finishing with a headline slot at London's Scala venue. They were also nominated Best New Band at the 2011 Classic Rock Roll Of Honour.

In 2012, Saint Jude began writing for their follow-up to Diary Of A Soul Fiend. On 8 November 2012, they announced a PledgeMusic campaign for an upcoming EP, to be released in February 2013, entitled Ladies & Gents.

Members
 Lynne Jackaman - vocals (founding member)
 Adam Green (died 2012) - guitar (founding member)
 Lee Cook - drums (founding member)
 Elliot Mortimer - keyboards
 Colin Palmer Kellogg - bass
 Marcus Bonfanti - guitar
 Matt Gest - keyboards
 Scott Wiber - bass
 Ivor Sims - guitar
 Joe Glossop

Discography
Studio albums
 Diary Of A Soul Fiend (2010) (Line-up: Jackaman, Green, Mortimer, Cook and Kellogg)
EPs
 Ladies & Gents (2013)

References

External links
 Official website

Musical groups from London
English blues rock musical groups
English hard rock musical groups